The Men's 500 metres competition at the 2019 World Single Distances Speed Skating Championships was held on 8 February 2019.

Results
The race was started at 16:55.

References

Men's 500 metres